Mirjaguda is a village and panchayat in Ranga Reddy district, AP, India. It falls under the Shankarpally mandal.
It is located 25 km from Hyderabad. The village's official languages are Hindi and Telugu.

References

Mirzaguda come under chevella Mandal Rangareddy District 35 km from ORR APPA

Villages in Ranga Reddy district